Castel Rozzone is a comune (municipality) in the Province of Bergamo in the Italian region of Lombardy, located about  east of Milan and about  south of Bergamo.

Castel Rozzone borders the following municipalities: Arcene, Brignano Gera d'Adda, Lurano, Treviglio.

Demographic evolution

References